Mount Kaye is a mountain in the Coopracambra National Park, north of the township of Cann River in East Gippsland in Victoria, Australia.

Geology
The Mount Kaye Range is an outcrop of black and white Noorinbee Granodiorite, exposed on slopes and peaks. Small streams draining the range descend  in a series of falls and cascades to the Cann River at the base.

Flora
The area between Mount Kaye and Mount Denmarsh, together with the nearby Back Creek catchment, has high biological significance, containing a large number of rare plants including Long-leaf Bitter pea (Daviesia wyattiana), Tasmanian Waxflower  (Philotheca virgata), Genoa Grevillea (Grevillea parvula), Finger Hakea (Hakea dactyloides), Rusty Velvet-bush (Lasiopetalum ferrugineum), New South Wales Pomaderris (Pomaderris ledifolia) and  Monkey Mint-bush (Prostanthera walteri). The furthest extent of  distribution for many sub-alpine species from Tasmania as well as eastern New South Wales species is reached at the Mount Kaye area.

Access
The nearest sealed road to the mountain is the Monaro Highway which runs along the Cann River valley  to the west. There are four-wheel drive tracks near Mount Kaye, however these are overgrown with difficult stream crossings and are suitable for emergency access only. Walking to the peak requires navigational skills and is physically demanding.

See also

List of mountains in Victoria

References

Kaye
East Gippsland